Star Blazer is a horizontally scrolling shooter programmed by Tony Suzuki for the Apple II and published by Broderbund Software in 1982. An Atari 8-bit family version was released in 1983 as Sky Blazer.

Gameplay
Star Blazer is a game in which the player is the Star Blazer, fighting back against the oppressive Bungeling Empire.

Reception
Barry Gittleman reviewed the game for Computer Gaming World, and stated that "The game is enjoyable for almost all gaming types. The only disappointment is the sudden ending after that terrific build-up. Star-Blazer must be seen to be truly appreciated."

Reviews
Computer and Video Games - Nov, 1982
Electronic Fun with Computers & Games - Jun, 1983

References

External links
Review in Softalk
1984 Software Encyclopedia from Electronic Games
Review in Creative Computing
Review in SoftSide
Review in Softline 
Review in Videogaming Illustrated
Review in Washington Apple Pi
Article in Electronic Games

1982 video games
Apple II games
Atari 8-bit family games
Broderbund games
Horizontally scrolling shooters
Video games developed in the United States